Feliciano! is a 1968 album by Puerto Rican guitarist José Feliciano. All of the tracks are acoustic cover versions of songs popularized by  other artists, including The Mamas & the Papas, The Doors, Gerry and the Pacemakers, The Beatles, Jorge Ben Jor, and Lou Johnson.

Feliciano! has been the most successful album of his career in the US, spending 59 weeks on the Billboard Top LP chart, peaking at number 2 (number 25 on the end-of-year chart for 1968 and number 66 for 1969); it also reached number 3 on the R&B charts in 1968 and number 3 on the Jazz charts. The album performed well outside the US, reaching number 1 in Canada and number 6 in the UK.

Feliciano! was nominated for Album of the Year at the 1969 Grammy Awards, and Jose Feliciano won Best New Artist. He also won Best Male Pop Vocal Performance for the song "Light My Fire" from the album. The album's producer Rick Jarrard also received a nomination for Producer of the Year.

The album cover shows a drawing by George Bartell of Feliciano with his guitar.

Track listing

Side one
"California Dreamin (John Phillips, Michelle Phillips) – 4:06
"Light My Fire" (Robbie Krieger, Jim Morrison, Ray Manzarek, John Densmore) – 3:30
"Don't Let the Sun Catch You Crying" (Gerry Marsden) – 2:50
"In My Life" (John Lennon, Paul McCartney) – 3:22
"And I Love Her" (instrumental) (Lennon, McCartney) – 3:58

Side two
"Nena Na Na" (Jorge Ben) – 2:30
"Always Something There to Remind Me" (Burt Bacharach, Hal David) – 2:58
"Just a Little Bit of Rain" (Fred Neil) – 2:45
"Sunny" (Bobby Hebb) – 3:28
"Here, There and Everywhere" (instrumental) (Lennon, McCartney) – 2:03
"The Last Thing on My Mind" (Tom Paxton) – 4:51

Personnel
José Feliciano – classical guitar, vocals, arrangements
Ray Brown – double bass
Milt Holland – percussion, drums
Jim Horn – alto flute, recorder, flute
George Tipton – orchestration, string & woodwind arrangements
Perry Botkin Jr. – arrangements
Uncredited – organ on "California Dreamin'"

Technical
Rick Jarrard – producer
Dick Bogert – recording engineer
George Bartell – cover illustration 
Recorded at RCA Victor's Music Center Of The World, Hollywood, California on November 21, 1967 and January 5 & 6, 1968

Chart performance

Certifications

References

1968 albums
José Feliciano albums
Albums arranged by Perry Botkin Jr.
Albums arranged by George Tipton
Albums produced by Rick Jarrard
RCA Records albums
Covers albums